The first round of the 2005–06 UEFA Cup began on 15 September 2005, which narrowed clubs down to 40 teams in preparation for the group stage.

Seeding

Summary

|}

First leg
All times CET

Second leg

All times CET

Hertha BSC won 4–1 on aggregate.

2–2 on aggregate; Levski Sofia won on away goals.

Heerenveen won 5–2 on aggregate.

Basel won 6–0 on aggregate.

CSKA Sofia won 2–0 on aggregate.

Beşiktaş won 4–2 on aggregate.

Bolton Wanderers won 4–2 on aggregate.

Brøndby won 3–2 on aggregate.

1–1 on aggregate; Red Star Belgrade won on away goals.

CSKA Moscow won 6–2 on aggregate.

Dinamo București won 5–2 on aggregate.

Rapid București won 2–1 on aggregate.

Espanyol won 3–1 on aggregate.

0–0 on aggregate; Marseille won 4–1 on penalties.

Grasshoppers won 4–1 on aggregate.

Strasbourg won 7–0 on aggregate.

Vitória de Guimarães won 4–0 on aggregate.

4–4 on aggregate; Halmstad won on away goals.

Hamburg won 2–1 on aggregate.

Dnipro Dnipropetrovsk won 5–1 on aggregate.

6–6 on aggregate; AZ won on away goals.

Lens won 5–3 on aggregate.

Litex Lovech won 3–2 on aggregate.

Maccabi Petah Tikva won 5–4 on aggregate.

Middlesbrough won 2–0 on aggregate.

Monaco won 5–1 on aggregate.

Palermo won 6–1 on aggregate.

3–3 on aggregate; PAOK won on away goals.

Rennes won 3–1 on aggregate.

Roma won 5–1 on aggregate.

Sevilla won 2–0 on aggregate.

Shakhtar Donetsk won 6–1 on aggregate.

Lokomotiv Moscow won 5–3 on aggregate.

Slavia Prague won 4–1 on aggregate.

Tromsø won 2–1 on aggregate.

Steaua București won 6–1 on aggregate.

Stuttgart won 2–1 on aggregate.

2–2 on aggregate; Viking won on away goals.

Sampdoria won 2–1 on aggregate.

Zenit Saint Petersburg won 1–0 on aggregate.

Notes
Note 1: Maccabi Petah Tikva played their home matches at Ramat Gan Stadium in Tel Aviv District instead of their regular stadium, Municipal Stadium, Petah Tikva.

External links
First Round Information UEFA.com
Seeding Information

2005–06 UEFA Cup
September 2005 sports events in Europe
UEFA Cup qualifying rounds